Nadis Airport
Scottish Campaign for Nuclear Disarmament
Single Convention on Narcotic Drugs